Persoonia papillosa is a species of flowering plant in the family Proteaceae and is endemic to a restricted area in the west of Western Australia.

Description
Flowering occurs from September to January.

Taxonomy
Persoonia papillosa was first formally described in 1994 by Peter Weston in the journal Telopea from specimens collected near Yuna in 1962.

Distribution and habitat
This geebung grows in sand and has only been collected from near the Murchison River and Yuna in the  Geraldton Sandplains biogeographic region of Western Australia.

Conservation status
Persoonia papillosa is classified as "Priority Two" by the Western Australian Government Department of Parks and Wildlife meaning that it is poorly known and from only one or a few locations.

References

papillosa
Flora of Western Australia
Plants described in 1994
Taxa named by Peter H. Weston